Piney Green is a census-designated place (CDP) in Onslow County, North Carolina, United States. The population was 11,658 at the 2000 census. It is part of the Jacksonville, North Carolina Metropolitan Statistical Area.

Geography
Piney Green is located at  (34.743093, -77.322239).

Demographics

2020 census

As of the 2020 United States census, there were 14,386 people, 4,742 households, and 3,430 families residing in the CDP.

2000 census
At the 2000 census, there were 148,658 people, 4,202 households, and 3,193 families residing in the CDP. The population density was 868.7 people per square mile (335.4/km). There were 4,671 housing units at an average density of 348.1 per square mile (134.4/km). The racial makeup of the CDP was 64.74% White, 24.56% African American, 0.75% Native American, 2.58% Asian, 0.25% Pacific Islander, 3.12% from other races, and 4.01% from two or more races. Hispanic or Latino of any race were 7.61% of the population.

There were 5,126 households, out of which 43.5% had children under the age of 18 living with them, 60.2% were married couples living together, 12.6% had a female householder with no husband present, and 24.0% were non-families. 17.8% of all households were made up of individuals, and 2.7% had someone living alone who was 65 years of age or older. The average household size was 2.77 and the average family size was 3.12.

In the CDP, the population was spread out, with 30.2% under the age of 18, 16.0% from 18 to 24, 33.6% from 25 to 44, 15.6% from 45 to 64, and 4.5% who were 65 years of age or older. The median age was 27 years. For every 100 females, there were 98.0 males. For every 100 females age 18 and over, there were 96.2 males.

The median income for a household in the CDP was $36,636, and the median income for a family was $40,117. Males had a median income of $27,994 versus $20,278 for females. The per capita income for the CDP was $15,353. About 7.3% of families and 10.5% of the population were below the poverty line, including 13.9% of those under age 18 and 15.4% of those age 65 or over.

References

Census-designated places in Onslow County, North Carolina
Census-designated places in North Carolina